Monceaux-sur-Dordogne (literally Monceaux on Dordogne) is a commune in the Corrèze department in central France.

Geography
Before joining the Dordogne, the Maronne river forms part of the commune's eastern boundary. The Dordogne forms part of its eastern border and most of its southern boundary.

Population

See also
Communes of the Corrèze department

References

Communes of Corrèze